Sheltered instruction is an approach to teaching English-language learners that integrates language and content instruction. The phrase "sheltered instruction", the original concept, and the underlying theory of comprehensible input are all credited to Stephen Krashen.

The dual goals of sheltered instruction are: 
 to provide access to mainstream, grade-level content, and
 to promote the development of English language proficiency.

Definition
Sheltered Instruction, also referred to as SDAIE in California, is a teaching style founded on the concept of providing meaningful instruction in the content areas (social studies, math, science) for English Language Learners (ELLs) as they work towards fluency in English.

This method type is often used in mainstream secondary classrooms where the students have a foundation of English education. A variety of instruction is used including the theories of Vygotsky's zone of proximal development. Instead of providing watered down curriculum for LEP student, sheltered instruction allows for the content to be equal to that of native English speakers while improving their grasp of the language. The teacher provides varied methods of instruction that allow students to create meaning of multifaceted content in classroom discussion, activities, reading and writing. Teachers call on a number of different instruction methods such as the use of socialization practices to allow the content to be more accessible.

The differences between ESL instruction and the use of sheltered instruction or SDAIE is that sheltered instruction does not focus entirely on language development; instead, through various other topics or actual content material in the curriculum, English proficiency is achieved.

Teacher Preparation

As in any instructional approach, the use of sheltered instruction is effective when the teacher is capable of administering the lessons effectively. Many pre-service teacher programs are working to equip teachers with the skills they need to be successful. Beginning with pre-service teachers achieving a strong foundation of cultural psychology, language theory and acquisition as well as certified content knowledge in their undergraduate major, the courses incorporate multiple field experiences as well as pedagogical methods and cultural diversity instruction. There are many alternative ways teachers can learn how to increase effectiveness of instructional delivery and create a culturally responsive classroom, including online resources.

Some U.S. public schools receive Title III funding to help pay for these preparation courses. Title III is the part of the No Child Left Behind Act that authorizes funds for English Language acquisition programs, including Professional development for educators.

Strategies

Since the basis of sheltered instruction or SDAIE is to provide a framework for language development then one of the simplest ways follow a set format of instruction. For example, beginning each lesson with an introductory activity that assesses the students’ knowledge in a non-threatening and non-graded format will allow the teacher to evaluate the students’ skill set. It is vitally important the teacher designs his/her lessons to clearly define language and content as well as make the activity meaningful through the linkage to past knowledge and present and supplemental materials. Some examples of lessons include hands-on and cooperative learning activities, vocabulary, and the use of visual clues. Teachers also place an emphasis on developing the students’ habits of organization and study skills.

Teachers may use sheltered instruction within a variety of program models (e.g., immersion, pull out, team-teaching).  Teachers may use sheltered instruction in a mainstream class to support English language learners, or a class may be specially designed, such as "Sheltered U.S. History."

"Many ELLs are also refugees", thus sheltered instruction can be one of the useful strategies for their instruction. The teacher should "speak more clearly and slowly", use more graphics and similar "multimodal" instructional tools, and speak using shorter "sentences and clauses."

Such classes may include only English language learners, or "linguistically diverse" language learners and English-fluent peers.

According to Michael Genzuk, SDAIE strategies typically include:

 Increase wait time, be patient. Give your students time to think and process the information before you provide answers. A student may know the answers but need more processing time in order to say it in English.
 Respond to the student's message, don't correct errors (Expansion). If a student has the correct answer and it is understandable, don't correct his or her grammar. The exact word and correct grammatical response will develop with time. Instead, repeat his or her answer, putting it into standard English, use positive reinforcement techniques.
 Simplify teacher language. Speak directly to the student, emphasizing important nouns and verbs, using as few extra words as possible. Repetition and speaking louder doesn't help; rephrasing, and body language does.
 Don't force oral production. Instead, give the student an opportunity to demonstrate his or her comprehension and knowledge through body actions, drawing pictures, manipulating objects, or pointing. Speech will emerge.
 Demonstrate, use visuals and manipulatives. Whenever possible, accompany your message with gestures, pictures, and objects that help get the meaning across. Use a variety of different pictures or objects for the same idea. Give an immediate context for new words. Understanding input is the key to language acquisition.
 Make lessons sensory activities. Give students a chance to touch, listen, smell and taste when possible. Talk about the words that describe these senses as students physically experiences lesson. Write new words as well as say them.
 Pair or group students with native speakers. Much of a student's language acquisition comes from interacting with peers. Give students tasks to complete that require interaction of each member of the group, but arrange it so that the student has linguistically easier tasks. Utilize cooperative learning techniques in a student-centered classroom.
 Adapt the materials to student's language level, maintain content integrity. Don't “water down” the content. Rather, make the concepts more accessible and comprehensible by adding pictures, charts, maps, time-lines, and diagrams, in addition to simplifying the language.
 Increase your knowledge. Learn as much as you can about the language and culture of your students. Go to movies, read books, look at pictures of the countries. Keep the similarities and differences in mind and then check your knowledge by asking your students whether they agree with your impressions. Learn as much of the student's language as you can; even a few words help.
 Build on the student's prior knowledge. Find out as much as you can about how the ideas and concepts you are teaching build upon the student's previous knowledge or previous way of being taught. Encourage the students to point out differences and connect similarities.
 Support the student's home language and culture; bring it into the classroom. An important goal should be to encourage the students to keep their home languages as they also acquire English. Let students help bring about a multicultural perspective to the subjects you are teaching. Encourage students to bring in pictures, poems, dances, proverbs, or games. Encourage students to bring these items in as part of the subject you are teaching, not just as a separate activity. Do whatever you can to help your fluent English-speaking students see all students as knowledgeable persons from a respected culture.

Sheltered Instruction Observation Protocol (SIOP)
The Sheltered Instruction Observation Protocol (SIOP), a research-based methodology, is a sheltered instruction approach to differentiated instruction and learning for English Language Learners (ELLs), providing access to content materials in school and meaningful language development opportunities. Sheltered instruction provides modified, but comprehensible grade-level information for students while simultaneously developing their English language skills. The SIOP method uses several related activities to assist ELLs with second-language acquisition, including detailed lesson plans, comprehensible input activities, scaffolding, learning strategies, student to student interactions, practice and application of content and language objectives, and review and assessment. The method consists of eight main components and 30 features, with a focus on creating a classroom environment where ELLs have meaningful opportunities to develop their academic English skills.

Below is a brief summary of the eight main components and 30 features of the SIOP method.

Lesson Preparation - Component #1 
Content Objectives (Feature 1) are one to two clearly defined objectives, supporting content standards and learning outcomes of the lesson, that are shared both visually and orally with students.

Language Objectives (Feature 2) are clearly defined objectives related to the content objectives that tell students what academic language they will learn and focus on during the lesson. In addition to using speaking, listening, reading, and writing language skills, language objects can include a focus on vocabulary development, language learning strategies, and syntax.

Content Concepts (Feature 3) provide ELLs with comprehensible access to grade-level content concepts. The materials should be scaffolded and adapted for student age and educational background without diminishing the curriculum concepts.

Supplementary Materials (Feature 4) help clarify the content of the lesson. Materials include, but are not limited to, hands-on manipulatives, realia (real-life objects that help students make connections to their own lives), pictures and other visuals, and multimedia materials.

Adaptation of Content (Feature 5) involves making content materials, such as texts and assignments, accessible to students of all levels of English proficiency. Adaptations include rewriting texts using shorter and simple syntax and utilizing primary language supports to supplement classroom texts.

Meaningful Activities (Feature 6) provide ELLs with opportunities to practice the lesson concepts through reading, writing, speaking, and listening language practice that relates to their own lives. Ideas for meaningful activities include jigsaw text reading and the use of graphic organizers to make connections across key concepts.

Building Background - Component #2 
Concepts explicitly linked to student background experiences (Feature 7) build upon student background knowledge of the world. The goal of this feature is to connect students' background knowledge with content materials to both build upon that knowledge and fill in the knowledge gaps to help students develop meaningful connections with the materials.

Links explicitly made between past learning and new concepts (Feature 8) create a bridge between the new information and previous lesson content and language by explicitly pointing out the connections between past learning and the new lesson materials. A few ways to make these critical connections is through questioning, referring to word banks, graphic organizers, maps, and other visuals.

Key vocabulary emphasized (Feature 9). Vocabulary knowledge is a key component to EL student success in comprehending content materials and lesson instruction.

Comprehensible Input - Component #3 
Appropriate Speech (Feature 10) assists ELLs in understanding the oral aspect of a lesson. Teachers should, if necessary, such as for classes with beginning ELLs, adjust their rate of speech and simplify their oral sentence structure by reducing the use of idioms, choosing less complex vocabulary words, and using repetition frequently.

Clear explanation of academic tasks (Feature 11) provided through use of clear, oral, written, and, if needed, modeled instructions, so students understand what they are expected to accomplish. By providing an example of the completed product, ELLs are able to reference the example, in addition to the written instructions, when they need clarification while completing the assignment.

A variety of techniques used (Feature 12) help make lesson concepts clear. These techniques include previewing the materials, hand-on activities, using gestures, visuals, and objects to assist ELLs in understanding what is being said. Additionally, modeling the assignment or task, using multimedia and audio supports, reinforcing the concepts through use of graphic organizers, and using repetition throughout the lesson help make the lesson concepts clear to ELLs.

Strategies - Component #4 
Learning strategies (Feature #13) include cognitive, metacognitive, and language learning strategies. Students use cognitive learning strategies when they manipulate, either physically or mentally, information. Examples include previewing text, taking notes, using a graphic organizer, and analyzing text. When using metacognitive strategies, students practices include predicting, clarifying, evaluating, synthesizing, and summarizing information. Language learning strategies focus on the use of English through, among other methods, analyzing the morphology and syntax of the language used and guessing or deducing meaning of a word or phrase based on context.

Scaffolding techniques (Feature #14) include verbal, procedural, and instructional. Verbal scaffolding can be provided through the use of think-alouds, paraphrasing, and asking questions to encourage students to elaborate their responses. Procedural scaffolding can be incorporated into lessons through modeling, guided practice, explicit teaching of materials. Instructional scaffolding includes graphic organizers and models of finished tasks.

Higher-order questioning and tasks (Feature #15) are purposeful and preplanned higher-order questions, such as interpretive and analytical questions, and tasks, such as comparing and contrasting information, are developed for each lesson to promote critical thinking skills.

Interaction - Component #5 
Frequent opportunities for interaction (Feature 16) are embedded in the lesson. These opportunities are conversational interactions and oral language practice between the teacher and students, and students with other students. In a conversational approach to teaching, the teacher acts a facilitator, allowing for ample opportunities for students to participate in high-quality discussions.

Grouping configurations (Feature 17) are varied and purposefully used during a lesson. Grouping options include whole class, small group, and partners.

Sufficient wait time (Feature 18) allows ELLs to process and formulate a response. After asking a question, teachers wait for student response rather than filling the silence.

Clarifying concepts in primary language (Feature 19) helps ELLs deepen their understanding of the content materials. ELLs are given opportunities to clarify or support key lesson concepts in their primary language through use of bilingual dictionaries, questioning a peer, or asking a bilingual aide.

Practice and Application - Component #6 

Hands-on practice with new knowledge (Feature 20)  includes multiple opportunities for hands-on activities and/or manipulatives to practice and interact with new information to practice the new content materials.

Application of content and language knowledge in new ways (Feature 21) allows ELLs to apply the new information from the lesson through meaningful activities which personalize the content materials, such as orally explaining the solution or writing a journal entry.

Integration of all language skills (Feature 22) involve activities which reinforce the lesson content and language objectives integrate all four language  skills (reading, writing, listening, speaking).

Lesson Delivery - Component #7 
Lesson delivery supports content objectives during lesson (Feature 23). The lesson instruction and activities clearly support the stated content objectives of the lesson.

Lesson delivery supports language objectives during lesson (Feature 24). The lesson instruction explicitly discusses the language objectives and time is provided for students to practice the target language.

Lesson delivery promotes student engagement (Feature 25). Students are paying attention and actively on task approximately 90% to 100% of the class period.

Lesson paced appropriately (Feature 26) based on the ability and needs of the students in the classroom.

Review and Assessment - Component #8 
Review of key vocabulary (Feature 27) during and at the end of each lesson to provide ELL students with repeated exposure in a variety of ways to new words.

Review of key content concepts (Feature 28) throughout lesson and at the end of the lesson by referring to the objectives posted visually for students to reference (such as on the classroom whiteboard).

Regular feedback on student output (Feature 29) provided throughout the lesson, including teacher to student and student to student feedback.

Assess student comprehension of objectives (Feature 30) throughout lesson and at the end of the lesson to determine if students met the content and language objectives. Assessments can include on-the spot checks with thumbs up/down inquiries and exit tickets.

Culturally Responsive Teaching 
While the SIOP method does not include culturally responsive teaching as a component or feature, respecting and affirming the culture of ELL students undergirds the SIOP model. The SIOP method supports culturally responsive teaching by drawing on ELL student background knowledge, choosing topics and readings relevant to the cultures represented in the class, and creating lessons with materials and activities which allow student choice to support and affirm ELL student cultural differences.

By implementing the 8 SIOP components and the corresponding 30 features, a teacher who utilizes the SIOP method helps create a low-risk environment where ELLs learn grade-level content materials while practicing their English language skills.

References

See also

Second-language acquisition

 Content and language integrated learning (CLIL)
 Comprehensible input (See: Stephen Krashen)
 Usage based language acquisition (See: Michael Tomasello, Brian MacWhinney, Elizabeth Bates, Diane Larsen-Freeman et al.)
 Competition model

General learning & co-construction of knowledge

 Social interactionist theory: An explanation of language development emphasizing the role of social interaction between the developing child and linguistically knowledgeable adults. It is based largely on the socio-cultural theories of Soviet psychologist Lev Vygotsky.
 Zone of proximal development: Learning through socialization where individuals are able to gain from the experience of their peers or teacher that they would not be able to on their own. The zone bridges gap between what is known and what can be known. Also largely based on the socio-cultural theories of Soviet psychologist Lev Vygotsky.
 Instructional scaffolding: A learning process designed to promote a deeper level of learning. Scaffolding is the support given during the learning process which is tailored to the needs of the student with the intention of helping the student achieve his/her learning goals (Sawyer, 2006). Although the term was never used in Vygotsky's papers, the concept is widely attributed to him as a necessary component of the Zone of proximal development.
 Cooperative learning: Cooperative Learning defines teaching methods in which pairs or small groups of learners work together to accomplish a shared goal.  The goal is the cooperation of learners to maximize their own and each other's learning.

Language-teaching methodology